Colonel John Alexander Bannerman (5 June 1759 – 8 August 1819) was appointed Governor of Prince of Wales' Island (Penang Island, Malaysia) and Province Wellesley (Seberang Perai) (both forming the settlement of Penang) in 1817 and also Treasurer from 1818.

Bannerman hoped to enter Parliament at the 1806 general election, but despite being prepared to spend £2,000 on a campaign, he failed to find a seat. However, a vacancy was created in early 1807 the resignation of Josias du Pre Porcher, MP for the pocket borough of Bletchingley which was then under the patronage of Rev. Jarvis Kenrick, and Bannerman was returned at the by-election in January 1807. He hoped to find a Treasury borough at the general election later that year, but was unsuccessful.

He was a director of the East India Company for two periods after 1811.
Bannerman served until his death from cholera in 1819. He was assisted by council member John MacAlister. Bannerman is buried at the Old Protestant Cemetery, George Town.

References

1759 births
1819 deaths
History of Penang
Governors of Penang
Directors of the British East India Company
Members of the Parliament of the United Kingdom for English constituencies
UK MPs 1806–1807
Administrators in British Penang